Alfonso Sánchez-Tabernero (Salamanca, 17 September 1961) is a full professor of media management and the current president of the University of Navarra.

Early life and education 
Alfonso Sánchez-Tabernero was born on 17 September 1961 in Salamanca to a family steeped in the livestock industry. His paternal grandfather was a doctor and his father a lawyer. On his mother’s side, both his great-grandfather and his great-great-grandfather served as president of the University of Salamanca. He has three siblings. He studied in a school run by the Marist Order. At 18 he moved to Pamplona to take a degree in journalism at the University of Navarra.

Teaching career 
In 1991, he was appointed professor and associate dean of the School of Communication at the Universidad del País Vasco. Having returned to Pamplona, he was dean of the School of Communication at the University of Navarra from 1996 to 2005. In 2007, he was awarded the status of full professor. He served as president of the European Media Management Education Association from 1998 to 2004.

Selected works 
 "El Correo Español-El Pueblo Vasco y su entorno informativo: (1910-1985)", Pamplona: Servicio de Publicaciones de la Universidad de Navarra, 1989, 558 pp. 
 "Las empresas informativas en la Europa sin fronteras", Bilbao: Universidad del País Vasco, Servicio Editorial, 1992, 150 pp. . Con Carmelo Garitaonandia
 "Concentración de la comunicación en Europa: empresa comercial e interés público", Barcelona: Generalitat de Catalunya, Centre d'Investigació de la Comunicació, 1993, 292 pp. . Traducido al francés: "La concentration des médias en Europe: l'entreprise commerciale et l'intérêt général", Manchester: Institut Europeen de la Communication, 1993, IV, 351 pp. , y al inglés: "Media Concentration in Europe: Commercial Entreprise and the Public Interest", Manchester: European Institute for the Media, 1993, [4] h., VII, 270 pp. 
 "Servicios comerciales de información", Barcelona: Ariel, 1996, 190 pp. . Con Alfonso Nieto Tamargo
 "Estrategias de marketing de las empresas de televisión en España", Pamplona: EUNSA, 1997, 293 pp. 
 "Dirección estratégica de empresas de comunicación", Madrid: Cátedra, 2000, 375 pp. 
 "Media concentration in the European market: New Trends and Challenges", Palgrave Macmillan, 2003, 196 pages, 
 "Los contenidos de los medios de comunicación: calidad, rentabilidad y competencia", Barcelona: Editorial Deusto-Grupo Planeta, 2008, 288 pp. 
 "The content of media: quality, profit and competition", Lisboa: Media XXI, 2008, 306 pp. 
 "Innovación en los medios: la ruta del cambio", Barañáin (Navarra): EUNSA, 2012, 326 pp. . Con Francisco Javier Pérez-Latre.

References

External links 
 Biography of Alfonso Sánchez-Tabernero on University of Navarra website.
 Currículum vitae of Alfonso Sánchez-Tabernero (Spanish). 
 Academic production of Alfonso Sánchez-Tabernero archived in DADUN, the University of Navarra repository.

1961 births
Living people